Christophe Le Roux (born 7 March 1969) is a French former professional footballer.

He played his whole career in Brittany, with FC Lorient, En Avant Guingamp, FC Nantes Atlantique, Stade Rennais FC and Vannes OC.

External links
 

1969 births
Living people
Sportspeople from Lorient
French footballers
Ligue 1 players
Championnat National players
FC Lorient players
En Avant Guingamp players
FC Nantes players
Stade Rennais F.C. players
Vannes OC players
Association football midfielders
Footballers from Brittany
Brittany international footballers